The Australian Fossil and Mineral Museum - Home of the Somerville Collection is located in the city of Bathurst in regional New South Wales Australia and was opened in July 2004. The collection is housed in a group of heritage buildings, the old 1874 public school buildings, in the centre of the city. Nearly 2000 specimens are on display from the internationally renowned Somerville Collection.

Exhibits

Tyrannosaurus rex
The main attraction for tourists and enthusiasts is the 10½ metre long and 4-metre high Tyrannosaurus rex (T.Rex) skeleton. In addition, the Museum houses Australia's largest collection of fossils in amber, fossil dinosaur eggs, and a large collection of opalised fossils.

The Somerville Collection
The Somerville Collection is approximately one third fossil and two-thirds mineral specimens and is features some of the finest and rarest examples of minerals from around the world and scientifically significant fossils from Australia.

Highlights from the mineral collection include minerals from over 100 Australian mine sites, 2000 million year old garnets, as well as diamonds, sapphires, rubies, and emeralds. Three dinosaur skeletons are displayed as well as a sabre-tooth cat skull, dinosaur egg fossils and some of the oldest fossils of early forms of life. Also in the collection is an extremely rare fossilised Gecko trapped in amber between 30 and 24 million years ago. in the Oligocene epoch on the geological time scale.

The Museum houses the lifetime collection of Warren Somerville AM. The holder of five degrees, a part-time university lecturer for more than 20 years, a full-time teacher in the NSW TAFE for more than 25 years, and an orchardist in Orange, he has spent a lifetime building one of the world's leading private collections of minerals and fossils. Somerville has been collecting specimens from around the world for 60 years. In 2000, Warren Somerville donated this priceless legacy to the people of Australia.

Popularity
Lonely Planet travellers have rated the Australian Fossil and Mineral Museum as the #1 attraction of 27 in the Central West (New South Wales).

Funding
Funding to establish the Museum was provided by all three levels of government, corporate sponsorship and philanthropic donations and the continuing operation of the museum is funded by the Bathurst Regional Council

References 

Natural history museums in Australia
Fossil museums
Mineralogy museums
Museums in New South Wales
Bathurst, New South Wales
Local museums in Australia
Geology museums
Paleontology in New South Wales
2004 establishments in Australia